Artur Oliver Wuorimaa (1 August 1854, Dragsfjärd - 9 November 1921; surname until 1906 Blomberg) was a Finnish Lutheran clergyman and politician. He was a member of the Diet of Finland in 1897 and of the Parliament of Finland from 1907 to 1910 and from 1911 to 1913, representing the Finnish Party and again from 1917 to 1921, representing the Agrarian League.

References

1854 births
1921 deaths
People from Kimitoön
People from Turku and Pori Province (Grand Duchy of Finland)
20th-century Finnish Lutheran clergy
Finnish Party politicians
Centre Party (Finland) politicians
Members of the Diet of Finland
Members of the Parliament of Finland (1907–08)
Members of the Parliament of Finland (1908–09)
Members of the Parliament of Finland (1909–10)
Members of the Parliament of Finland (1911–13)
Members of the Parliament of Finland (1917–19)
Members of the Parliament of Finland (1919–22)
People of the Finnish Civil War (White side)
University of Helsinki alumni
19th-century Finnish Lutheran clergy